St. Eugene Cemetery is one of the most famous cemeteries in Algeria. It is situated in a suburb of the city of Algiers in the commune of Bologhine. Covering an area of 14.5 hectares, it lies at the foot of Notre Dame d'Afrique, and is maintained by twenty employees In 2012, the President of the French Republic François Hollande visited it.

It comprises tombs of numerous Algerian notables and it is one of the most preferred place for actors and actresses and other artists (opera singers, musicians, painters, sculptors, architects, writers, poets). It also includes the tombs of several scientists, academicians and sportspeople.

Notable interments
Alexandre Fourchault
Fernand Yveton
630 French soldiers in a military square of the two wars where the tombs are grouped into Army Corps specialties.
Queen Ranavalona III. She will, however, be unearthed in 1938.
Victimes of the Isly street shooting.
King Béhanzin of Dahomey, in 1906. However, his remains were repatriated in 1928.
Alfred Pillafort, compagnon de la Libération.
Alain Veyret's father.
A monument is erected to the memory of the writer Louis Lecoq.
Edmond Yafil
Saül Durand a.k.a. Maalem Mouzino

Note: This list is very far from complete: the number of notables buried here exceeds 10,000.

See also
 Cemeteries of Algiers

References

External links
Tombs' index of St. Eugene Cemetery
t. Eugene Cemetery at billiongraves.com

Cemeteries in Algeria
Religion in Algeria